The deep-dwelling moray (Gymnothorax bathyphilus) is a  deepwater moray eel found in the south Pacific Ocean, around Easter Island and Desventuradas Islands. It reaches a maximum length of about 76 cm. The type specimen was taken at a depth of 250 m.

References

deep-dwelling moray
Fauna of Easter Island
Fish of the Pacific Ocean
deep-dwelling moray
Endemic fauna of Chile